Gianfranco "Franco" Bertini (born 28 August 1938) is a retired Italian professional basketball player. In 2012, he was induced into the Italian Basketball Hall of Fame.

Club career
During his pro club career, Bertini won the Italian League championship with Olimpia Milano, in 1959.

National team career
Bertini competed with the senior Italian national basketball team at the 1964 Summer Olympic Games, where Italy finished in fifth place. He also played at the 1963 FIBA World Championship, and at the 1965 EuroBasket.

References

External links
FIBA Profile 

1938 births
Living people
Basketball players at the 1964 Summer Olympics
Competitors at the 1963 Mediterranean Games
Competitors at the 1967 Mediterranean Games
Mediterranean Games gold medalists for Italy
Mediterranean Games silver medalists for Italy
Olimpia Milano players
Olympic basketball players of Italy
Pallacanestro Varese players
Point guards
Victoria Libertas Pallacanestro players
Mediterranean Games medalists in basketball
Italian men's basketball players
1963 FIBA World Championship players